Miller-El v. Dretke, 545 U.S. 231 (2005), is a United States Supreme Court case that clarified the constitutional limitations on the use by prosecutors of peremptory challenges and of the Texas procedure termed the "jury shuffle."

Background 
Thomas Miller-El was charged with capital murder committed in the course of a robbery.  After voir dire, Miller-El moved to strike the entire jury because the prosecution had used its peremptory challenges to strike ten of the eleven African-Americans who were eligible to serve on the jury.  This motion was denied, and Miller-El was subsequently found guilty and sentenced to death.

Opinion of the Court 
In 1986, the Supreme Court ruled in Batson v. Kentucky that a prosecutor's use of peremptory challenges may not be used to exclude jurors on the basis of race.  Miller-El appealed based on the Batson criteria and asked that his conviction be overturned. In June 2005, the Supreme Court ruled 6–3 to overturn Miller-El's death sentence, finding his jury selection process had been tainted by racial bias.

The Court had held in Batson that a defendant could rely on "all relevant circumstances" in making out a prima facie case of purposeful discrimination. Miller-El clarified that "all relevant circumstances" included evidence outside "the four corners of the case." Specifically, the Court allowed statistical analysis of the venire, side-by-side comparison of struck and empaneled jurors, disparate questioning, and evidence of historical discrimination. 

The Court extended the holding of Miller-El in Snyder v. Louisiana.

References

External links
 

Batson challenge case law
United States Supreme Court cases
United States Supreme Court cases of the Rehnquist Court
2005 in United States case law